Stadio Giovanni Zini is a football stadium in Cremona, Italy. It is currently the home of U.S. Cremonese. The stadium was built in 1919 and holds 20,641.

History
The stadium was named after Giovanni Zini, a goalkeeper of U.S. Cremonese who died during the World War I.

On 16 November 2013, it hosted Italy's end-of-year rugby union international against Fiji. Italy won 37–31.

References

Venue
Giovanni Zini
Giovanni
Cremona